Dorio is a village and a former municipality in Messenia, Peloponnese, Greece. Since the 2011 local government reform it is part of the municipality Oichalia, of which it is a municipal unit. The municipal unit has an area of 102.832 km2. The population of the municipal unit is 2,983, and of the village alone 915 (2011 census). The small settlement of Ano Dorio is nearby. Dorio has been mentioned in Homer's Iliad, and by Strabo and Pausanias. Homer recounts a myth that Dorio was the location of a music competition between Thamyris and the Muses.

References

 Athens2004.com - Dorio

Populated places in Messenia